Devlies is a surname. Notable people with the surname include:

 Carl Devlies (born 1953), Belgian politician
 Jos Devlies, Belgian medical doctor